Pilbeam is a surname. Notable people with the surname include:

 David Pilbeam, American academic and paleoanthropologist
 Harriette Pilbeam (known professionally as Hatchie), Australian singer-songwriter and musician
 Mike Pilbeam, English founder of Pilbeam Racing Designs
 Nova Pilbeam, British actress
 Pamela Pilbeam, English historian
 Rex Pilbeam, Australian politician
Sally Pilbeam, Australian paratriathlete

See also
 Pilbeam Racing Designs